Bono-dong is a neighbourhood of Sangnok-gu, Ansan, Gyeonggi Province, South Korea. It is officially divided into Bono-1-dong, Bono-2-dong and Bono-3-dong.

Bono 1 is a provincial and agricultural area with Banwol Plating Complex. It is a multi-family housing complex with many residents. In Bono Garden, Bono rice is produced and supplied to local residents.

Bono 2 is a typical residential area, with about 3,700 apartment complexes in the west and multi-family houses on the east. In the south is the 'Gakgol' park.

Bongo 3 is a mixture of apartment complexes and commercial areas. Especially, this area is Seoul Subway Line 4, Sangroksu Station station area, which is a key point of traffic and has a lot of working people.

References

External links
 Bono-1-dong 
 Bono-2-dong 
 Bono-3-dong 

Sangnok-gu
Neighbourhoods in Ansan